The CEMAC Cup was a non-commercialised football tournament that included only local league players from the Republic of Congo, Chad, Equatorial Guinea, Cameroon, Gabon and the Central African Republic. As the local leagues in these six countries are amateur leagues, it was a non-professional competition. However, it is a good competition for recruiters who want to sign new talent in European clubs.

These countries have also played seven tournaments before, the UDEAC Cup, from 1984 until 1990. After more than a decade, the same countries decided to revive the competition under another name, the CEMAC Cup.

The tournament is organised by the Central African Football Federations' Union.

Results

Most CEMAC Cup wins

External links
Official website for 2010 tournament (archived 28 September 2010)
Overview at RSSSF archives

 
Recurring sporting events established in 2003
Recurring sporting events disestablished in 2014